Yolmeh Khandan (also Romanized as Yolmeh Khandān; also known as Yūlmeh Khandān and Yolmeh Khandān-e Pā’īn) is a village in Gorganbuy Rural District, in the Central District of Aqqala County, Golestan Province, Iran. At the 2006 census, its population was 1,007, in 193 families.

References 

Populated places in Aqqala County